Edward Yataro Hosaka (1906 - 1961) was an American botanist who specialized in identifying plants of the Hawaiian Islands. His 1935 University of Hawai'i at Manoa masters thesis was entitled 'A Floristic and Ecological Study of Kipapa Gulch'. He authored Sport Fishing in Hawaii published in 1944 which was republished in 1973 as Shore Fishing in Hawaii.

References

1907 births
1961 deaths
20th-century American botanists
University of Hawaiʻi at Mānoa alumni